Sisymbrium erysimoides, known as smooth mustard,  is a plant in the family Brassicaceae.    It is found on roadsides and wasteland, and as a weed of arable land.  A native to western Mediterranean region, it is now well-established throughout the world.

Description
Cool season annual, erect, glabrous or shortly pubescent herb 10–80 cm tall. Basal leaves are to 15 cm long, lyrate-pinnatifid, toothed, petiolate, reducing to lanceolate, mostly toothed. Flowerheads are paniculate. Sepals are 1–2 mm long and glabrous. Petals are 1–2.5 mm long, yellow to pale yellow. Siliqua are linear, straight, horizontal, 2.5–5 cm long, 1 mm wide and attenuate into a style; pedicels are thick and 2–5 mm long. Flowering is in late winter and spring.

Introduced in Australia where is now widespread in dry regions west of the Tablelands.

Uses

In food
Young leaves are eaten as salads.

Traditional medicine
Ethnobotanically used as a medicinal plants for respiratory disorders. Antioxidant molecules- Apigenin, apigenin-7-O-galctoside, apigenin-7-O-β-rhamnoside, apigenin-7-O-glucuronide, kaempferol, apigenin-7-O-rhamnosyl galactoronide, kaempferol-3-xyloside-7-galactoside, quercetin-6,4′-dimethoxy-3-fructo-rhamnoside, quercetin 4′-methoxy-3-fructo-rhamnoside were reported to identified from the plant. The whole plant extract was reported to have  anti-inflammatory and analgesic activities.

References

erysimoides